William A. Schmidt (May 21, 1902 – June 19, 1992) was an American welder and shop foreman who served two terms as a Democratic member of the Wisconsin State Senate from the Sixth District (the 2nd, 7th, 10th, 20th & 25th Wards of the City of Milwaukee, Wisconsin).

Background 
Schmidt was born in Princeton, Wisconsin. He was Roman Catholic. He received his early education at parochial school in
Montello, Wisconsin and the Montello High School. He attended Marquette University for one year. He was a welder who became a maintenance
foreman for A. O. Smith. Schmidt was active in his labor union, serving as chairman of the bargaining and coordinating committees of his local. He was a member of the Knights of Columbus, Fraternal Order of Eagles, Holy Name Society of St. Michael's Church, Badger Fisherman's League, and Montello Rod and Gun Club.

Career
In the 1948 Democratic primary election for the Sixth Senate District, Schmidt (a former Wisconsin Progressive) won the nomination by 22 votes from incumbent Edward Reuther, and went on to win the general election in a four-way race against Republican Assemblyman Paul Jaeger, as well as a Socialist and a Wallace "People's Progressive" candidate. During the 1951 session, he served as assistant floor leader for the Democrats. He was re-elected in 1952; unopposed in his primary, he again defeated Republican Jaeger, whom he had faced in 1948.

Schmidt would remain a member of the Senate through 1956, but did not run for re-election, but instead ran for Lieutenant Governor of Wisconsin; Schmidt and gubernatorial running mate William Proxmire lost in the general election. (The man who beat Schmidt for Lieutenant Governor, Warren P. Knowles, would eventually become governor himself). Schmidt was succeeded in the Senate by fellow Democrat William R. Moser.

References

1902 births
1992 deaths
Catholics from Wisconsin
People from Princeton, Wisconsin
Politicians from Milwaukee
Wisconsin Progressives (1924)
Democratic Party Wisconsin state senators
20th-century American politicians